Juliana Augusta "Guus" Preitinger (also known as Guus van Dongen) (18 October 1878, in Cologne – 21 January 1946, in Paris) was a German-born Dutch painter who lived most of her adult life in Paris. She married the painter Kees van Dongen, and they had a son, who died as an infant, and a daughter together. They divorced in 1921. She had a career as a modern painter.

Early life and education
Juliana Augusta "Guus" Preitinger was born in 1878 in Cologne. Her family moved to Rotterdam, the Netherlands and became Dutch citizens. When she showed artistic talent as a child, her family encouraged her to get art training.

Preitinger and van Dongen first met as painting students at the art academy in Rotterdam. They decided to move to Paris together, and Preitinger went first to find work.

Marriage and family
They married on 11 July 1901 in Paris. The couple had a son, who died two days after he was born in December 1901. They had a daughter, Augusta, known as "Dolly", born on 18 April 1905. That year, the family moved to an apartment in the Bateau Lavoir in Montmartre, where they were neighbors and became friends with the artist Pablo Picasso and his companion Fernande Olivier.

In 1914, Guus took Dolly went to Rotterdam for the summer to see their families. The outbreak of World War I prevented them from returning to Paris until 1918. By then, Kees van Dongen had started a relationship with a married socialite, the fashion director Léa Alvin, also known as Jasmy Jacob. Augusta and Kees divorced in 1921.

Career
Preitinger continued her painting career in Paris and had an exhibit in 1921 at the Galerie Artes. She died in Paris in January 1946.

Notes

Sources
 Artprice

External link

1878 births
1946 deaths
Dutch painters
Modern painters
Dutch women painters
German emigrants to the Netherlands
20th-century Dutch women artists
People of Montmartre
Artists from Cologne